This is a list of things named after Barack Obama, the 44th president of the United States. This list includes proposed name changes.

Biota

Barack Obama has been commemorated in the scientific names of at least 14 species, the most of any U.S. president.

Animals
Aptostichus barackobamai, a species of wafer trapdoor spiders
Baracktrema obamai, a blood fluke found in Malaysian turtles
Desmopachria barackobamai, a diving beetle from French Guiana
Etheostoma obama, a darter species
 Lasioglossum obamai, a Cuban bee
 Nystalus obamai (Western striolated puffbird), a bird from the Amazon
Obamadon gracilis, an extinct lizard
Paragordius obamai, a parasitic worm from phylum Nematomorpha
 Placida barackobamai, a sea slug
 Spintharus barackobamai, a Cuban spider
 Teleogramma obamaorum, a cichlid, honoring Barack Obama and First Lady Michelle Obama
 Tosanoides obama, a fish discovered in the Papahanaumokuakea Marine National Monument
 Obamus coronatus, an Ediacaran organism
 However, the genus name Obama (flatworm) and particularly the invasive species Obama nungara were not named after Barack Obama. The name "Obama" in this case is a coincidence and is derived from the Tupi language (which is spoken in the same area where the flatworm was discovered) where it comes from the words "oba" ("leaf") and "ma" ("animal"), which is a reference to the body shape of species in this genus.

Fungi
Caloplaca obamae, a lichen species

Individual animals
Barack Obama, a horse which competed in endurance games

Schools

California

Barack Obama Academy – Oakland, California – Alternative Learning Community renamed after Barack Obama in March 2009
Barack Obama Global Preparation Academy – Los Angeles – Built in mid 2010
Barack Obama Charter School – Compton, California – Qued Charter Elementary School renamed after Barack Obama in January 2009

Connecticut 
Barack H. Obama Magnet University School – New Haven, Connecticut – Connecticut school to be named after former President Obama

Georgia 
 Barack H. Obama Elementary Magnet School of Technology – Atlanta, Georgia – Opened in January 2017
 Barack and Michelle Obama Academy – Atlanta, Georgia – Renamed in November 2016

Illinois
Barack Obama School of Leadership and STEM – Chicago Heights, Illinois

Maryland

Barack Obama Elementary School – Westphalia, Maryland, near Upper Marlboro – Prince George's County Public Schools - Named after Barack Obama in June 2009 while under construction

Michigan
Barack Obama Leadership Academy – Detroit, Michigan – Timbuktu Academy, which has been open since 1997, will become Barack Obama Leadership Academy

Minnesota

Barack and Michelle Obama Service Learning Elementary – Saint Paul, Minnesota

Mississippi
Barack Obama International Baccalaureate Elementary School – Jackson, Mississippi  – Renamed as of October 2017, from Jefferson Davis, the Confederacy's only president

Missouri

Barack Obama Elementary School – Pine Lawn, Missouri – dedicated as Barack Obama Elementary School in August 2011.

New Jersey
Barack Obama Elementary School – Asbury Park, New Jersey – Asbury Park Public Schools – Formerly Bangs Avenue Elementary School
Barack Obama Academy – Plainfield, New Jersey – Plainfield Academy for Academic & Civic Development renamed to Barack Obama Academy
Barack Obama Green Charter High School – Plainfield, New Jersey – Charter high school opened in September 2010
Barack Obama Elementary School – Jersey City, New Jersey - Jersey City Public Schools

New York

Barack Obama Elementary School – Hempstead, New York – Ludlum Elementary School renamed to Barack Obama Elementary School

Ohio
Barack Obama Elementary School – Maple Heights, Ohio – 4-5

Pennsylvania
Obama High School – Pittsburgh, Pennsylvania – Pittsburgh IB World 6–12 renamed to Pittsburgh Obama High School

Texas
Barack Obama Male Leadership Academy – Dallas, Texas – all male, grades 6–10

Virginia
Barack Obama Elementary School - Richmond – Renamed in 2018, formerly named after J. E. B. Stuart

Wisconsin
Barack Obama School for Career and Technical Education – Milwaukee, Wisconsin – PK-12

Streets

Spain
Avinguda Barack Obama – In 2008, a street in the town of Nàquera in Valencia, Spain, was named in honor of Barack Obama for being "an icon of multiculturalism". The street was formerly named after José Antonio Primo de Rivera, founder of the fascist party Falange and son of Spanish dictator Miguel Primo de Rivera.

Tanzania
Barack Obama Drive – A road in the Tanzanian city Dar es Salaam was renamed in honor of Obama's visit to the country in July 2013. The road, located by the Indian Ocean, leads to the Tanzanian State House. It was previously known as Ocean Road.

United States

California
Obama Way – Seaside, California – renamed from Broadway Avenue effective September 15, 2010.
Obama Boulevard – Los Angeles, California – renamed from Rodeo Road officially on May 5, 2019. 
President Barack H. Obama Highway – Glendale, California, Pasadena, California, and Los Angeles, California - renaming of a section of California State Route 134 (part of the "Ventura Freeway", officially signed on December 20, 2018.
Barack Obama Boulevard - San Jose, California – Rename portions of Bird Avenue, South Montgomery Street, South Autumn Street and North Autumn Street to Barack Obama Boulevard, approved January 5, 2021, and signposted August 21, 2021

Florida
Barack Obama Avenue – Opa-locka, Florida – City commission approved the renaming of Perviz Avenue effective Presidents' Day, February 2009.
Barack Obama Boulevard – West Park, Florida – City commission approved the renaming of SW 40th Ave, Effective July 2009.
President Barack Obama Parkway – Orlando, Florida – approximately  miles in length; includes sidewalks and bike lanes.
Barack Obama Boulevard – Pahokee, Florida
President Barack Obama Highway within the limits of Riviera Beach, Florida
Barack Obama Boulevard – Quincy, Florida

Georgia
Barack Obama Boulevard – Valdosta, Georgia --On July 22, 2021, the Valdosta city council approved the renaming of Forrest Street, previously named for Nathan Bedford Forrest, to Barack Obama Boulevard.

Illinois
South Barack Obama Avenue – East St. Louis, Illinois – City council approved the renaming of a half mile section of 4th street to Barack Obama Avenue in August 2012.
Barack Obama Presidential Expressway – In July 2017, the Illinois General Assembly voted to name a section of Interstate 55 the Barack Obama Presidential Expressway.

Indiana
Barack Obama Way – New Albany, Indiana – a section of Reas Lane was renamed in the last week of Obama's presidency to honor the fact that "Obama's stimulus plan has helped the city create new jobs and facilitate economic development."

Missouri
President Barack Obama Boulevard – St. Louis, Missouri – Part of Delmar Boulevard given honorary renaming to Obama Boulevard, even though the postal address will retain Delmar Boulevard.

Mississippi
Barack Obama Avenue – Ruleville, Mississippi

Ohio
 President Barack Obama Avenue – Cincinnati, Ohio – Cincinnati City Council approved a project to rename Reading Road from Downtown Cincinnati to Reading, pending private donations; all 30,000 signs are expected to be installed by September 2021

Topographical features

Antigua and Barbuda
Mount Obama in Antigua and Barbuda – renamed from Boggy Peak on Obama's birthday, August 4, 2009.

Other facilities
The Barack Obama Plaza - including a petrol station, food court and visitor centre that provides information on Obama's connections, at Moneygall in County Offaly, between Dublin and Limerick. Moneygall was birthplace of Obama's great-great-great-grandfather.
 President Barack Obama Main Library – St. Petersburg, Florida renamed its main library in 2018.

Holidays
Obama Day, Kenyan holiday honoring Obama's 2008 election victory
Barack Obama Day, state holiday celebrated in Illinois

Proposed renamings 

 Pembroke Park Road – Hollywood, Florida – portion of (or all of) road proposed to be renamed Barack Obama Boulevard
 Midway International Airport – Chicago, Illinois – In 2015, then-Chicago Mayor Rahm Emanuel proposed renaming the airport after Obama in 2015.
 I-57 - Illinois - U.S. Congressman Bobby Rush introduced the Barack Obama Highway Act in 2019 to rename the entire portion of I-57 in Illinois as Barack Obama Highway.
 Barack Obama Boulevard – Milpitas, California – Milpitas City Council approved the renaming of a section of Dixon Landing Road to Barack Obama Boulevard but later shelved the plan

See also
List of topics related to Barack Obama
List of places named for George Washington
List of places named for Thomas Jefferson
List of places named for James Monroe
List of places named for Andrew Jackson
List of places named for James K. Polk
List of things named after Ronald Reagan
List of things named after George H. W. Bush
List of things named after Bill Clinton
List of things named after George W. Bush
List of things named after Donald Trump
List of things named after Joe Biden
List of educational institutions named after presidents of the United States
Presidential memorials in the United States

References

External links

Named
Obama